Brain of Blood (also known as The Creature's Revenge, The Oozing Skull, and The Undying Brain) is a 1971 American horror film directed by Al Adamson and starring Grant Williams, Kent Taylor and Reed Hadley. Angelo Rossitto and John Bloom also appeared in it. It was also Hadley's last film appearance before his death in 1974.

Plot
Amir, the benevolent ruler of Kalid, is dying, but there is the hope of transplanting his brain into another body. Freshly deceased, he is flown to the United States where Dr. Trenton, having unwisely put off acquiring another body until the last minute, transplants Amir's brain into the body of the disfigured simpleton assistant who failed in said chore. Dr. Trenton has a few nefarious plot twists of his own in mind, and then there's the thing with the dwarf and the woman chained in the basement.

Cast
Grant Williams as Bob Negserian
Kent Taylor as Dr. Lloyd Trenton
John Bloom as Gor
Regina Carrol as Tracey Wilson
Vicki Volante as Katherine
Angelo Rossitto as Dorro
Reed Hadley as Amir 
Zandor Vorkov as Mohammed
Richard Smedley as Angel
Gus Peters as Charlie
Margo Hope as Pale Girl
Bruce Kimball as Jim
Irv Saunders (billed as Ervin Saunders) as Victim

Production
Brain of Blood was produced by Samuel M. Sherman, Al Adamson and Kane W. Lynn. It was written by Joe Van Rodgers (screenplay) along with Lynn and Sherman. It was filmed by cinematographer Louis Horvath and edited by J.P. Spohn.

Cinematic Titanic
In 2007, Joel Hodgson created a new comedy riffing project called Cinematic Titanic. Along with other former cast members of Hodgson's former series Mystery Science Theater 3000, Hodgson riffed Brain of Blood (under the later DVD title The Oozing Skull) as their first film for the new project.

See also
 List of American films of 1971

References

External links

1971 horror films
American science fiction horror films
1970s English-language films
Films shot in Los Angeles
1971 films
1970s science fiction horror films
Films directed by Al Adamson
1970s American films